Jennifer Sterling-Folker (born December 21, 1960) is a Professor of Political Science at the University of Connecticut. She was the Alan R. Bennett Honors Professor of Political Science. She is a specialist in International Relations theory.

Biography
She received her M.A. and Ph.D. in political science from the University of Chicago, and a B.A. in political science and art history from the University of New Hampshire.

Sterling-Folker served as co-editor, along with Mark A. Boyer, of International Studies Review, a journal of the International Studies Association, and, along with Kimberly Hutchings, George Lawson, and Mathias Albert, of Review of International Studies, a journal of the British International Studies Association.

In her own research, Sterling-Folker has explored the lines between different schools of international relations theory such as constructivism and neoliberalism in international relations, also called neoliberal institutionalism; and realism and constructivism.  She also led efforts to apply international relations theory to the 1999 conflict in Kosovo and 2003 U.S. led invasion of Iraq.

Selected publications

Books

 Editor, Making Sense of International Relations Theory, second edition (Lynne Reinner Press, 2013).
 Theories of International Cooperation and the Primacy of Anarchy: Explaining U.S. International Monetary Policy-Making After Bretton Woods (SUNY Series in Global Politics, 2002).

Articles

 “All Hail to the Chief: Liberal IR Theory in the New World Order.” (2015) International Studies Perspective, vol. 16, no. 1 (February): 40-49. Contribution to a special symposium on "Diversity in IR Theory."
 “A Disagreeable Dinner Guest? Waltz and the Study of Global Governance.” (2014) Australian Journal of Political Science, vol. 49, no. 3 (August): 530-534. Prepared for inclusion in a special issue, “Waltz Today: Reflections on the Legacy of Kenneth N. Waltz.”
 “The Emperor Wore Cowboy Boots.” (2008) International Studies Perspective, vol. 9, no. 3 (August): 319-330.
 “Lamarckian With a Vengeance: Human Nature and American International Relations Theory.” (2006)  Journal of  International Relations and Development, vol. 9, no. 3 (September): 227-246.
 “Discourses of Power: Traversing the Realist-Postmodern Divide.” Co-author with Rosemary E. Shinko. (2005) Millennium: Journal of International Studies, Special Issue, vol.33, no. 3, (March): 637-664. Reprinted in Power in World Politics, editors Felix Berenskoetter and M. J. Williams (Routledge, 2007).
 "Realism and the Constructivist Challenge: Rejecting, Reconstructing, or Rereading." (2002) International Studies Review, vol. 4, no. 1 (Spring): 73-97.
 "Competing Paradigms or Birds of a Feather? Constructivism and Neoliberal Institutionalism Compared." (2000) International Studies Quarterly, vol. 44, no. 1 (March): 97-119.
 "Realist Environment, Liberal Process, and Domestic-Level Variables." (1997) International Studies Quarterly, vol. 41, no. 1 (March): 1-25.

Book chapters

 “Be Careful What You Wish For: Positivism and the Desire for Relevance in the American Study of IR.” In What’s the Point of International Relations?, Rorden Wilkinson, Jan Selby, and Synne Dyvik, eds. (Routledge, 2017). 
 “Disciplining Human Nature: The Evolution of American Social Scientific Theorizing.”  Co-author with Jason Charrette. In Man, Agency, and Beyond:  The Evolution of Human Nature in International Relations,  Daniel Jacobi and Annette Freyberg-Inan, eds. (Cambridge University Press, 2015).
 “Realism.”  Co-author with Jason Charrette. In International Organization and Global Governance, Thomas G. Weiss & Rorden Wilkinson, eds. (Routledge, 2013).
 “Constructivism.”  Co-author with Dina Badie. In The Routledge Handbook of American Foreign Policy,  Steven Hook and Christopher Jones, eds. (Routledge, 2011).
 “Neoliberalism.” In International Relations Theory: Discipline and Diversity, Tim Dunne, Milja Kurki, and Steve Smith, eds., (Oxford University Press, 2010).
 "Realist Theorizing as Tradition: Forward Is As Forward Does.” In Rethinking Realism in International Relations: Between Tradition and Innovation, Annette Freyberg-Inan, Patrick James, and Ewan Harrison, eds. (Johns Hopkins University Press, 2009).
 “Neoclassical Realism and Identity: Peril Despite Profit Across the Taiwan Straits.” In Neoclassical Realism, the State, and Foreign Policy, Steven Lobell, Norrin M. Ripsman, and Jeffrey Taliaferro, eds. (Cambridge University Press, 2009).
 "Realist Global Governance: Revisiting Cave! hic dragones and Beyond." In World Orders and Rule Systems, Contending Perspectives on Global Governance, Matthew Hoffmann and Alice Ba, eds. (Routledge, 2005).
 "Conflict and the Nation-State: Magical Mirrors of Muggles and Refracted Images."  Co-authored with Brian Folker. In Harry Potter in International Relations, Daniel Nexon and Iver B. Neumman, eds. (Rowman and Littlefield, 2006).
 "Evolutionary Tendencies in Realist and Liberal Theory". In Evolutionary Interpretations of World Politics, ed. William R. Thompson. (Routledge, 2001.)
 "Between a Rock and a Hard Place: ‘Assertive Multilateralism’ in Post-Cold War US Foreign Policy-Making."  In After the End: Making U.S. Foreign Policy in the Post-Cold War World, ed. James M. Scott. (Duke University Press, 1998).

References

American women political scientists
American political scientists
American international relations scholars
1960 births
Living people
21st-century American women